Pick Up Your Head is the second album by Middle Class Rut, released June 25, 2013 by Bright Antenna Records. The album is available as a digital download, CD and 12" double record. Produced by the band, the album was mixed by Dave Sardy.

On April 26, 2013, Loudwire premiered the music video for the single "Aunt Betty".

Track listing
Born Too Late - 2:24
Leech - 3:02
Weather Vein - 3:12
No More - 3:21
Cut the Line - 3:33
Sing While You Slave - 3:01
Dead Eye - 4:03
Pick Up Your Head - 3:23
Police Man - 3:26
You Don't Belong - 2:28
Aunt Betty - 4:23
Take a Shot - 4:08

Deluxe Edition Bonus Tracks

I Need to Know (Tom Petty and the Heartbreakers cover) - 2:25
Nothin' - 4:42

Singles

References

External links
Official Band Site
Bright Antenna Official Website
Release on Discogs

2013 albums
Middle Class Rut albums